Cristiano Frattini (born 17 April 1973) is an Italian racing cyclist. He rode in the 1996 Tour de France.

References

External links
 

1973 births
Living people
Italian male cyclists
Place of birth missing (living people)
Cyclists from the Province of Varese